Bataw is a leavened flatbread from Egypt. It is widely consumed in the Egyptian countryside. The main ingredients of the bread vary depending on the region.

Variations
In Asyut it is often made with barley, corn, or a mixture of barley and wheat. In Akhmim it is commonly made with corn and fenugreek, whereas in Qena, further south in Upper Egypt, it is exclusively made with barley.

Preparation
Ball-shaped lumps of dough are placed in an oven, traditionally with a wooden ladle with a long handle referred to as maghrafa, and then flattened with the bottom side of it. The loaf is removed when it turns brown and crusty.

Consumption
In the countryside farmers often eat it with various types of soft white cheeses as a light meal between breakfast and dinner.

See also
 Egyptian cuisine

References

Arab cuisine
Egyptian breads